Vilainiai (formerly) is a village in Kėdainiai district municipality, in Kaunas County, in central Lithuania. According to the 2021 census, the village had a population of 1157 people. It is located next to the north eastern edge of Kėdainiai, on the left bank of the Nevėžis river. There is a kindergarten, a library, a sports school, a culture house, Water Management Institute of Vytautas Magnus University Agriculture Academy.

History
Vilainiai has been known since 1744. There was a manor and a watermill till the mid-20th century. It developed largely during the Soviet era as a settlement of Land Improvement Institute.

Demography

Images

References

Villages in Kaunas County
Kėdainiai District Municipality